Tiffany Leong (24 October 1985 – 28 December 2015), was a Malaysian actress, host and model based in Singapore. She died on December 2015 due to neuroendocrine cancer tumors, aged 30.

Personal life and  career
Leong was a model and beauty queen before joining Astro and enjoyed some success as a television hostess. She switched to acting in 2006 and joined MediaCorp in Singapore. Initially she was mostly cast in Singapore-Malaysia co-productions and made her debut in a Singapore-produced series in the 2008 drama La Femme. She was nominated for the Top 10 Most Popular Female Artistes at the 2011 Star Awards.

In 2006, Leong filmed two dramas, The Beginning and Falling in Love, in supporting roles. In 2007, she filmed two more dramas called,  Man of the House and Fallen Angel.

In 2008, Leong filmed the dramas La Femme and Where the Heart Is and in 2009, she filmed My Destiny and Welcome Home, My Love. In 2010, she filmed four dramas, but had only supporting roles, she acted in dramas like  Tribulations of Life, Injustice, Priceless Wonder and Friends Forever .

In 2011, she managed to film two more dramas Code of Honour and Prosperity.

In 2012, she filmed two dramas The Quarters and Laws of Attraction. In 2013, she filmed in one drama called 2013 Radio Rhapsody due to her illness. In 2015, she managed to film a drama called Mind Game despite her battle with cancer.

Health and death
In July 2013, the former Mediacorp artiste was diagnosed with multiple endocrine neoplasia (MEN) syndrome, and was later confirmed to have neuroendocrine cancer tumors in her liver. She had 60 per cent of her liver removed, and returned to work in late 2014.
 
On 24 December 2015, Leong was admitted to a hospital in Kuala Lumpur after suffering a relapse. She died on the afternoon of 28 December 2015. Her funeral was held at Nilai Memorial Park & was cremated.

Filmography

Awards and nominations

References

External links
Profile on xinmsn
 

1985 births
2015 deaths
Malaysian film actresses
Malaysian people of Cantonese descent
21st-century Malaysian actresses
Deaths from liver cancer
Deaths from cancer in Malaysia